The Polish 1st Armoured Division (Polish 1 Dywizja Pancerna) was an armoured division of the Polish Armed Forces in the West during World War II. Created in February 1942 at Duns in Scotland, it was commanded by Major General Stanisław Maczek and at its peak numbered approximately 18,000 soldiers. The division served in the final phases of the Battle of Normandy in August 1944 during Operation Totalize and the Battle of Chambois and then continued to fight throughout the campaign in Northern Europe, mainly as part of the First Canadian Army.

History

After the fall of Poland and then France in 1940, many of the remaining Poles that had fought in both campaigns retreated with the British Army to the United Kingdom.

Formation
Stationed in Scotland, the Polish 1st Armoured Division was formed as part of the Polish I Corps under Wladyslaw Sikorski, which guarded approximately 200 kilometres of British coast in 1940-1941. The commander of the Division, General Stanislaw Maczek, was Poland’s premier mechanized commander, and many of his subordinate officers from the unit he commanded in 1939, the 10th Mechanized Brigade, had made their way to Britain with him. They were organized on the British Armoured Division model, equipped with British uniforms, weapons and tanks. They were initially equipped and trained on Crusader tanks but in late 1943 and early 1944 these were replaced with Sherman tanks and Cromwell tanks. They then participated in war games together with the 4th Canadian (Armoured) Division.

Normandy

By the end of July 1944, the 1st Armoured had been transferred to Normandy, its final elements arriving on 1 August. The unit was attached to the First Canadian Army as part of the 21st Army Group. This may have been done to help in communication, as the vast majority of Poles did not speak English when they arrived in United Kingdom from 1940 onwards. The Division joined combat on 8 August during Operation Totalize. It twice suffered serious casualties as a result of "friendly fire" from Allied aircraft, but achieved a victory against the Wehrmacht in the battles for Mont Ormel, and the town of Chambois. This series of offensive and defensive operations came to be known as the Battle of Falaise, in which a large number of German Army and SS divisions were trapped in the Falaise Pocket and subsequently destroyed. Maczek's division had the crucial role of closing the pocket at the escape route of the trapped German divisions, hence the fighting was desperate and the 2nd Polish Armoured Regiment, 24th Polish Lancers and 10th Dragoons, supported by the 8th and 9th Infantry Battalions, took the brunt of German attacks by units attempting to break free from the pocket. Surrounded and running out of ammunition, they withstood incessant attacks from multiple fleeing panzer divisions for 48 hours until they were relieved.  The total losses of the division from August 7 when it entered combat until the end of the battle of Falaise on August 22 were 446 killed, 1501 wounded, and 150 missing, or 2097 soldiers in total during about two weeks of fighting.

Belgium and the Netherlands
After the Allied armies broke out from Normandy, the Polish 1st Armoured Division pursued the Germans along the coast of the English Channel. It liberated, among others, the towns of Saint-Omer, Ypres, Oostnieuwkerke, Roeselare, Tielt, Ruislede, and Ghent. During Operation Pheasant a successful outflanking manoeuvre planned and performed by General Maczek allowed the liberation of the city of Breda without any civilian casualties (29 October 1944). The Division spent the winter of 1944-1945 on the south bank of the river Rhine, guarding a sector around Moerdijk, Netherlands. In early 1945, it was transferred to the province of Overijssel and started to push with the Allies along the Dutch-German border, liberating the eastern parts of the provinces of Drenthe and Groningen including the towns of Emmen, Coevorden and Stadskanaal.

Germany
In April 1945, the 1st Armoured entered Germany in the area of Emsland. On 6 May, the Division seized the Kriegsmarine naval base in Wilhelmshaven, where General Maczek accepted the capitulation of the fortress, naval base, East Frisian Fleet and more than 10 infantry divisions. There the Division ended the war and, joined by the Polish 1st Independent Parachute Brigade, undertook occupation duties until it was disbanded in 1947; it, together with the many Polish displaced persons in the Western occupied territories, formed a Polish enclave at Haren in Germany, which was for a while known as "Maczków". The majority of its soldiers opted not to return to Poland, which fell under Soviet occupation, preferring instead to remain in exile. Many artefacts and memorabilia belonging to Maczek and the 1st Polish Armoured Division are on display in the Polish Institute and Sikorski Museum in London.

Organization during 1944–45
1st Armoured Division — General Stanisław Maczek — comprising:

10th Armoured Cavalry Brigade (10 Brygada Kawalerii Pancernej) – Col. T. Majewski
 1st Armoured Regiment (1 pułk pancerny) – Lt. Col. Aleksander Stefanowicz
 2nd Armoured Regiment (2 pułk pancerny) – Lt. Col. S. Koszustki
 24th Polish Uhlan Regiment (Armoured; 24 pułk ułanów im. Hetmana Żółkiewskiego) – Lt. Col. J. Kański
 10th Dragoons Regiment (10 pułk dragonów zmotoryzowanych) – Lt. Col. Władysław Zgorzelski

 3rd Infantry Brigade (3 brygada piechoty) – Col. Marian Wieroński 
 1st Podhale Rifles Battalion (1 batalion strzelców podhalańskich) – Lt. Col. K. Complak
 8th Rifle Battalion (8 batalion strzelców) – Lt. Col. Aleksander Nowaczyński
 9th Rifle Battalion (9 batalion strzelców flandryjskich) – Lt. Col. Zygmunt Szydłowski
 1st Polish Independent HMG Squadron (samodzielna kompania ckm.) – Maj. M. Kochanowski 
 Divisional Artillery (Artyleria dywizyjna) – Col. B. Noel 
 1st Motorized Artillery Regiment (1 pułk artylerii motorowej) – Lt. Col. J. Krautwald de Annau
 2nd Motorized Artillery Regiment (2 pułk artylerii motorowej) – Lt. Col. K. Maresch
 1st Anti-Tank Regiment (formed in 1945 from smaller units) (1 pułk artylerii przeciwpancernej) – Major R. Dowbór
 1st Anti-Aircraft Regiment (1 pułk artylerii przeciwlotniczej) – Lt. Col. O. Eminowicz, later Maj. W. Berendt

 Other Units 
 10th Mounted Rifle Regiment (10 pułk strzelców konnych) (armoured reconnaissance equipped with Cromwell tanks) – Maj. J. Maciejowski
 HQ, Military Police,
 engineers – Lt. Col. J. Dorantt
 1st Signals Battalion – Lt. Col. J. Grajkowski
 administration, military court, chaplaincy, reserve squadrons, medical services.

Numbers
 885 – officers and non-commissioned officers
 15,210 – other ranks (other enlisted soldiers)
 381 – tanks (mostly M4A4 Shermans and Sherman Fireflys), later the Division was the only unit in 21st Army Group to be issued the Sherman M4A1(76)w, late-model Shermans with the 76 mm gun M1 in a larger turret.
 473 – artillery pieces (mostly motorised)
 4,050 – motor cars, trucks, utility vehicles, artillery carriers.

See also

 List of military divisions
 Western betrayal
 World War II Behind Closed Doors: Stalin, the Nazis and the West
 Polish migration to the United Kingdom
 Polish Canadians
 Great Polish Map of Scotland

Notes

References

Further reading
 Stephen E. Ambrose, Citizen Soldiers: The U. S. Army from the Normandy Beaches to the Bulge to the Surrender of Germany. Simon & Schuster, 1998.
 John D. Buckley, British armour in the Normandy campaign, 1944, Routledge, 2004
 Terry Copp, Fields of Fire: The Canadians in Normandy, University of Toronto Press, 2003
 McGilvray, Evan. The Black Devils' March: A Doomed Odyssey: The 1st Polish Armoured Division 1939-1945. Solihull, West Midlands, England: Helion, 2005
 Roman Johann Jarymowycz, Tank tactics: from Normandy to Lorraine, Lynne Riener Publishers, 2001
 John Keegan, Six Armies in Normandy, Penguin Books, 1982
 Willy Vallaey, Roeselare 1944-45, de Bevrijding: euforie en ontgoocheling, Roeselare, 303 p.

External links
 Website of Maczek Museum in Breda
 Website of Polish forces in the West
 Breda Liberated
 Website describing the campaign of the division
 Lance Corporal Waldemar Czyz
 The Life and Times of Jan Pirog, a Polish Soldier
 Captain Kazimierz Duda - 1st Polish Armoured Division - C.K.M.
 Polish military in Scotland - Link no longer working
 Canadian Military History in Perspective
 Galuba Leon

Movie
 Stanislaw Maczek a movie in Polish

1st Armoured Division
Military units and formations established in 1942
01
Military units and formations disestablished in 1947